Tina Kennard is a fictional character on the Showtime television network series The L Word and The L Word: Generation Q, shown nationally in the United States. She is played by American actress Laurel Holloman. Tina lives in Los Angeles, California, and mostly hangs out in West Hollywood. She is the mother of Angelica Porter-Kennard and initially the life partner of Bette Porter. After she and Bette break up, the two become on-again-off-again lovers for the ret of the series, and eventually marry and divorce between the events of The L Word and Generation Q.

Storyline

Back Story
In the context of the six seasons of The L Word very little is said about Tina's background and nothing at all is revealed about her family. Only in the interrogation tapes, released online after the airing of the final episode of season 6, does Tina reveal some 'truths' about her upbringing. As a child, Tina and her two siblings were abruptly moved to Atlanta, Georgia by her mother when Tina's politician father refused to end his extramarital affair.

Tina's first sexual relationship was an abusive one - her older sister molested her for three years when they were children. Her sister later became a born-again Christian to deny her own homosexuality, while hypocritically shunning Tina for being bisexual.  Tina kept her abuse history secret from everyone, including Bette, and only confessed it to interrogating police officers after Jenny Schecter's death.

Prior to meeting Bette, Tina lived largely as a straight woman and had a few relationships, along with two abortions in her early twenties.

Bette and Tina met when Tina's then-boyfriend Eric took her to the Bette Porter Gallery, where the two instantly became attracted to one another. Bette noticed Tina's right earring had fallen off. Despite the fact that Bette returned it to her, Tina left her earring at Bette's gallery so she could come back and get it later. Bette had kept it for her. While Tina was picking it from her hand, Bette kissed her. Shortly after, Tina left Eric to begin a relationship with Bette.

Season 1
At the beginning of the first season, having been a couple for seven years, Tina and Bette are in the process searching for a sperm donor so that Tina can be artificially inseminated. After a successful insemination, Tina conceives, but suffers a miscarriage before she is even showing. This event is very traumatic for Tina, who finds comfort in working for a charity organization. Though she finds fulfillment there, her new career drives her further away from Bette. Bette then has an affair with carpenter Candace Jewell to fulfil her sexual needs. Tina eventually finds out, and in the ensuing fight, they have sex. Though consent remains unclear, Tina eventually submits to Bette and later moves out of their house to live with Alice.

Season 2
During the second season, Tina lives with Alice, and under her advice, decides to seek legal advice over her separation from Bette. Tina gets into contact with Joyce Wischnia (Jane Lynch), a gay civil rights lawyer who eventually makes a sexual pass at her. Tina then learns that Joyce is known in the lesbian community for sleeping with her clients, and ends their association. It is then revealed that Tina secretly inseminated herself before she learned of Bette's affair, and is now several months pregnant. Not wanting anyone to know about this because of her broken relationship with Bette and previous miscarriage, Tina hides her expanding body with loose clothes. Eventually, Alice notices that Tina appears to have gained weight, and blames this on the breakup with Bette. She has a dinner with Bette at their former house and plans to tell Bette then, but is derailed when Bette begins dominating the conversation with discussions of her work problems. After her charity organisation is granted money from the Peabody Foundation, Tina begins a relationship with Helena Peabody. It is Helena who reveals Tina's condition to Bette, and the two are shown as having a rivalry for Tina's affections. Helena's promiscuity and possessiveness combine to push Tina back towards Bette, who in turn is reaching out to her over the loss of her father Melvin. Though Tina experiences a difficult and traumatic labour, her baby girl Angelica is delivered safely, and at the end of the season it is revealed that she plans to move back in with Bette and raise their baby together.

Season 3
The third season is set six months after Angelica's birth, in which Tina and Bette are shown suffering more marital strife (including Bette losing her job at the CAC, and showing little interest in finding a new one). The couple appears to be more distant than ever; Bette seeks partner support from an overwhelmed Tina, who starts looking for the protection Bette cannot give her outside the home. Helena Peabody has just bought a movie studio, and offers Tina the chief development executive position.

Tina claims to have rediscovered her attraction for men, and Bette decides to go on a spiritual retreat. Because of this revelation, Bette decides to remove Tina's 'life-partner privileges'. During Bette's retreat, Tina (who has already had an online fling and also a frustrated attempt at fulfilling her interest with a male movie producer) meets Henry Young (Steven Eckholdt), a divorced man with one son, Mikey. Realizing that her relationship with Bette may end soon, Tina starts an affair with Henry, hoping to fool the family court into giving her sole custody of Angelica after she separates from Bette by appearing in a heterosexual family, after which it is implied that she will leave Henry and Mikey. Bette and Tina have difficulties with a social worker who is tasked with evaluating their second-parent adoption process, who is both unimpressed with Bette's attitude towards finding another job and sows doubts in Tina about Bette adopting Angelica. As Tina and Henry (who claims to be unconcerned about Tina's past lesbian life and also shows doubts about Bette's parental rights) continue settling in, Bette decides to visit Joyce in order to obtain full custody of Angelica (unaware that this was what Tina was expecting her to do). Later on, Bette decides to withdraw her sole custody petition, but the notification unfortunately reaches Joyce too late. After receiving Bette's letter, Tina decides to withdraw her consent for allowing Bette to become Angelica's other legal parent, effectively finally taking steps to separate Bette from Angelica forever as per her plan. At Shane and Carmen's wedding, Bette attempts to reason with Tina, but Tina tells her bluntly that she no longer wants Bette to adopt Angelica (referring to her as "my child"), and that she is going to start a family with Henry, who will adopt Angelica instead. Aware of Tina's true intentions, Bette warns her to stop her farce. The season closes with Tina and Henry returning home and discovering Angelica is missing, having been kidnapped by Bette.

Season 4
Bette returns with Angelica after a short time away. Though Tina appears ready to proceed with pressing charges against Bette, Joyce Wischnia informs her that no court will believe her pretense with Henry and will most likely have Angelica placed in a heterosexual foster family or adopted by a heterosexual couple rather than granting either of them custody due to their individual actions, and persuades her to reach an agreement with Bette. Though relations are generally strained between them at the start of the season, things gradually improve between the pair and they agree on shared custody. Relations with her close friends also show strain, as Alice and Jenny react negatively to Tina sleeping with men and her attempt to use the legal system's homophobia against Bette. Tina is still working in the movie studio, "Peabody-Shaolin Film Studios", and acquires the rights to adapt for the screen a novel of Jenny Schecter's, "Lez Girls". Work on "Lez Girls" strains the relationship between her and Jenny due to their conflicting opinions on how the piece should be adapted, and also leads Tina to meeting Kate Arden (Annabella Sciorra), the selected director for "Lez Girls"; it becomes apparent that there is a mutual attraction between the two, around the same time that Henry, who had since learned of Tina's real intentions with Bette and Angelica, ends his relationship with Tina and kicks her out of his home. Tina subsequently moves into her trailer at the movie studio. Meanwhile, Tina slowly renews her friendship with Bette and witnesses her enter a relationship with sculptor Jodi Lerner. She subsequently realizes how much she wants Bette back and begins taking steps to sabotage her relationship with Jodi while pretending to support it.

Season 5
Tina repeatedly clashes with Jenny while producing Lez Girls.  Shane and Alice try to be Tina's wingmen but Tina's jealousy of Bette's relationship with Jodi affects her dating prospects. Tina starts to drop hints to Bette that she wants her back, making comments about how she looks at Jodi and noting that she used to look at her the same way. When Bette does not respond, Tina meets a woman, Brenda, and sleeps with her on their first date to spite Bette. Bette finds out and appears to express jealousy herself during a self-defence class. Later that evening, they catch the other alone in a bar lounge, where Tina tells Bette she is no longer with Brenda. Succumbing to Tina's hints, Bette kisses her and they start an affair. For a while, both Tina and Bette wonder if what is happening to them is nothing more than a sexual reconnection. During a blackout, Bette and Tina get stuck in an elevator on their way to their Couples therapist. They reminisce on past events and Tina finally acknowledges how badly she treated Bette while she was with Henry, but despite all of it, Bette tells Tina that she still loves her and they end up having sex. They both agree to keep the affair a secret until after the Subaru Pink Ride. The truth of the affair comes out during the camp fire "I Never" game.  Bette admits to her sister Kit that she loves Tina while Tina also admits to Shane and Alice that she too still loves Bette. Jodi brushes her off when Tina tries to apologize as Jodi picks up Bette at The Planet. After Bette breaks off the relationship and endures a shocking public humiliation at the first exhibition of a new Jodi Lerner piece, Bette finds comfort with Tina at the Lez Girls''' wrap party.

Season 6
Tina moves back in with Bette, and they decide to adopt a second child. In preparation, they begin to add an expensive extension to their house.

The pair finally meet young pregnant Marci in Nevada, an underprivileged caucasian woman expecting a half African-American son.  Despite the fact that Marci's family rejects the notion of giving the child to a lesbian couple, Marci agrees to give Tina and Bette her child.  However, this transaction is threatened when Joyce Wishnea informs the pair that Nevada law does not permit adoption to same sex couples.  A solution is reached when Bette and Tina agree to board Marci during her pregnancy, but when they arrive to the Los Angeles bus station to meet her, Marci is not on the bus.  They later appear to abandon the hope of adopting Marci's child.

Tina unknownly accepts a lunch meeting with filmmaker Dylan Moreland, only to learn that Dylan used the meeting as an excuse to recruit Tina to help her win back her ex-lover Helena. Aware that Dylan is straight and that she and her husband previously attempted to swindle Helena out of her fortune, Tina refuses the request.

Meanwhile, Tina's job at the studio is threatened when the Lez Girls negative is stolen.  Tina's boss Aaron believes Jenny is responsible for the theft and orders Tina to retrieve the negative from her.  But when Tina confronts her, Jenny claims innocence and soon suggests that the film's hedge fund millionaire producer William was probably the true thief. Later, the negative is ransomed via correspondence faxed to the studio, signed by Tina and thereby implicating her as the thief.  Tina is incredulous and afraid for her job, but finally snaps when she sees Aaron and William at a dinner meeting with new clients that she wasn't informed of.  Believing herself to be already fired, she causes a scene, angrily accuses Aaron of mistreatment and William of theft, and quits.

Also in this season, Bette reconnects with her bisexual college crush Kelly Wentworth, and the pair open an art gallery together. Though Kelly rejected Bette during their college days to the point that Bette considered suicide, Kelly makes constant flirtations towards Bette in front of Tina, referring to her as a "player". Later, despite Bette insisting that those days are over, it becomes obvious that Tina is not convinced, as their affairs with Candace, Henry and Jodi have effectively destroyed any trust that they once had in each other. Later on, Jenny manages to film an encounter between Bette and Kelly on her cellphone; as Bette is picking up broken glass from the floor, the angle from Jenny's window makes it look as though she is performing cunnilingus on Kelly. Jenny threatens Bette that she will show the footage to Tina, who she knows will believe it, unless Bette confesses the alleged indiscretion first.

Tina soon finds herself in a new business meeting in New York, where she is offered her dream job.  She and Bette decide to move to New York so Tina can take the job; to Tina's surprise, Bette asks her to marry her once they move, and she accepts.  At their going away party in Los Angeles, Jenny prepares a video montage of several friends wishing them farewell.  During the party, Shane leads Tina to Shane and Jenny's attic, where she has uncovered the missing Lez Girls negative.  Tina is enraged, believing Jenny has stolen them and lied to her (the true thief is later revealed, via online interrogation tapes to be Jenny's ex-lover, Lez Girls actress Niki Stevens, who planted the negatives in Jenny's attic to save her career and destroy Jenny's).  Shortly afterwards, Jenny is found dead in Bette and Tina's pool.  The series continuity ends with Tina and her friends being interrogated by police regarding Jenny's death.

The Interrogation Tapes
One day after the television series ends, footage of Tina's police interrogation appears on Showtime's L Word website ("The Interrogation Tapes"), during which she reveals certain elements of her early life such as her adulterous father and secret, incestuous sexual relationship with her elder sister that lasted three years.

The L Word: Generation Q
By the time of Generation Q'', set over ten years after Jenny's death, Bette and Tina have separated again. Dialogue reveals that at some point, Bette and Tina eventually got married, but got divorced after Tina fell in love with another woman, Carrie. Bette is shown to have primary custody of Angelica, who now lives with her and refers to Tina as "Mama T", though they still communicate over matters regarding Angelica. 

In season one, after Bette comes into conflict with Tyler and Felicity Adams, both of whom seek to sabotage her campaign for Mayor of Los Angeles (since Bette once had an affair with Felicity while she was married to Tyler but refused to commit to her), Tina returns to offer Bette emotional support, having been called by Angie. It is revealed that Tina left Bette partly because she could not cope with Bette's controlling nature, and did not attend Kit's funeral after she died of a drug overdose, something which Bette never forgave Tina for. Despite their troubled past, after Bette gives a speech revealing her reason for running for mayor and determination not to drop out, Bette and Tina admit that they still love each other to a certain degree, and share a hug, during which Bette asks Tina not to leave. Later, Tina meets up with Bette and Shane at Shane's new gay bar, "Dana's", where Tina asks Bette to dinner. The two meet up at Bette's house, where Tina reveals that she is moving to Los Angeles in order to be closer to Angie. Though Bette hopes to renew their relationship, Tina reveals that she is actually looking for a place for herself and Carrie, who she is going to marry, and that she wants to reveal it to Angie along with Bette and Carrie. Though obviously devastated by the news, Bette gives Tina her blessing. In the season finale, both Bette and Angie accept that Tina is not coming back, and Bette finally decides to move on from Tina by accepting a dinner date with Maya, a lesbian reporter who was covering her mayoral campaign.

In season two, both Tina and Carrie are drawn further into Bette and Angie's lives when Angie does some more background information about Marcus Allenwood, learns that she has a half-sister, Kayla, and discovers that Marcus is dying of kidney failure and wants to see if she is a suitable donor for a transplant. Though Bette continuously treats Carrie with contempt and rudeness, Tina does not once stand up for Carrie, to the point that Carrie eventually lashes out and asks Tina how she ever married Bette in the first place; when Tina tells Carrie not to talk about Bette like that and says that Bette's acceptance has to be a part of their relationship, Carrie becomes angrier and accuses Tina of still prioritising Bette over her even though they are divorced. At a charity poker game while Tina is away, after Carrie confesses her past of isolation and desire for acceptance as a lesbian to Shane, she proposes to Bette that they be more civil to each other, but Bette coldly and rudely turns her down. Carrie subsequently becomes drunk and despondent to the point that she admits to Shane and Tess her second thoughts about marrying Tina due to Bette's constant cruelty and disrespect towards her. Tina later learns of Bette's behaviour, and while visiting Marcus in the hospital to persuade him to see Angie, she asks Bette why she cannot be happy for her and Carrie, going as far as to ask her directly if she is still in love with her, but Marcus dies of cardiac arrest before Bette can answer. Later, at Alice's celebration party for her new autobiography, Tina is approached by Bette again, who tries to answer Tina's question after having learned of Carrie's second thoughts from Shane. Though Tina denies that she is in love with Bette and that Shane should not have told her that, Carrie overhears the conversation. Finally fed up of feeling inferior to Bette and not being treated properly by Tina, which Tina accidentally worsens by telling Carrie to her face that nobody expects her to measure up to Bette, Carrie officially calls off the wedding and leaves, despite Bette's attempts to apologize and Tina begging her to stay. Tina furiously confronts Bette and accuses her of sabotaging her relationship with Carrie out of spite before leaving, but later, just as Bette is leaving to join her lover Pippa Pascal at her new art exhibition, for reasons unknown, Tina appears at her doorstep, asking to come in.

The Chart

References

The L Word characters
Fictional bisexual females
Television characters introduced in 2004
Fictional characters involved in incest
Fictional victims of child sexual abuse